Ger Brady is a Gaelic footballer who plays for Ballina Stephenites and the Mayo county team. He plays center half-forward or alternatively left half-forward or most often as a utility eagle-eyed playmaker, capable of slicing through the toughest of defences. He won an All-Ireland Senior Club Championship medal with his club in 2005. He is David's lesser-known brother, and has a cat called Maisey.

References

Living people
Ballina Stephenites Gaelic footballers
Gaelic football utility players
Mayo inter-county Gaelic footballers
Year of birth missing (living people)